Jun Hyo-seong (Hangul: 전효성; Hanja: 全 烋星; born October 13, 1989) often simply known as Hyoseong or Hyosung, is a South Korean singer and actress.

In 2005, she was a finalist in Mnet's Battle Shinhwa which led to her signing a recording contract with Good Entertainment. In 2007, she was going to debut in the group Five Girls, with G.NA, Wonder Girls' Yubin, After School's Uee and former T-ara member and former Spica member Yang Jiwon; however, the group disbanded before they were able to debut due to the company's financial problems. Hyoseong was later discovered by TS Entertainment through a show aired on SBS MTV called Diary of Five Girls and spent two years with the company as a trainee. In 2009, she debuted with Song Jieun, Han Sunhwa and Jung Hana as the four-member girl group Secret. Hyoseong debuted as a solo artist in 2014.

Life and career

1989–2004: Early life and childhood
Jun Hyoseong was born in Cheongju, Chungcheongbuk-do, South Korea on October 13, 1989. Hyoseong's name is derived from the word '유성' which is Korean for 'meteor'. She was named this way as her father and maternal grandmother saw a shooting star across the sky on the day of her birth. Hyoseong's family struggled financially and she and her family earned extra money by delivering newspapers every morning since she was in 3rd grade. Ever since she was young, she was known amongst her friends for her singing and dancing skills. However, she never had thoughts of actually becoming a singer until she was in 6th grade. She admitted:

In middle school, she was the leader of her school's dance club and worked part-time jobs to earn the money to travel to Seoul for auditions. Her parents were against her choice at first but later supported her decision when they saw how dedicated she was towards her goal.

2005–2008: Career beginnings, Five Girls and personal struggles

In 2005, Hyoseong failed her audition for talent shows hosted in Cheongju and Seoul. She later won an audition held earlier by the same management company in Cheongju in May 2005.

She was then advised by an agent at Good Entertainment to audition for Mnet's "Battle Shinhwa" and 
was picked as one of the final twelve participants and among them, three were females. She expressed:

 
She went on to add:

She was picked as the final 6 and later went on to sign a recording contract with Good Entertainment. She signed officially in 2006 and started to live in the dorms with Yoobin and Uee as a trainee and started going to school in Seoul. Good Entertainment had initially intended for Hyoseong to debut in a three-member group along with Yoobin and Uee, but ended up adding G.NA and Jiwon. They were set to debut as a five-member group called "Five Girls". In 2007, before their official debut, the group starred in a reality show on MTV called "Diary of Five Girls". Five Girls were never able to debut due to their company's financial issues.

In 2008, after "Five Girls" disbandment, she started working at a part-time job and managed to earn enough money to attend Inha University; however, her college life was short-lived.

However, she was faced with a larger obstacle during her 11th grade when her father was diagnosed with lung cancer, though he initially recovered after treatment. Her father was still weak when he decided to go back to work to support his family and the cancer recurred, this time being much more aggressive. The doctors told Hyoseong's family to "be ready". Her father died of lung cancer in 2008. At this point, Hyoseong was no longer a trainee with Good Entertainment and had decided to start attending college again. However, her plans changed when a TS Entertainment agent contacted her.

2009–2014: Debut with Secret and rising popularity

In 2008, a TS Entertainment agent had seen Hyoseong in "Diary of Five Girls" and contacted her to audition for their company. Hyoseong passed the audition and began living as a TS Entertainment trainee. TS Entertainment announced that they would debut a four-member girl group in October 2009. Hyoseong, along with Han Sunhwa, Song Jieun and Jung Hana, debuted as the group, Secret. Prior to their debut, the group appeared in a documentary called "Secret Story" which chronicled their debut process. They released their debut single "I Want You Back" in October 2009.

In April 2010, Secret released their first mini album entitled Secret Time which spawned the hit single "Magic" and served as their breakthrough song in South Korea. In August 2010, they released their second mini album entitled "Madonna" and the title track continued their success as it topped the Gaon Single Charts.

In January 2011, the group deviated from their "sexy" and "sassy" image and released "Shy Boy", a "cutesy" and retro inspired song. Although they were worried with the 180 degrees transformation, the single exceeded their expectations as the song was a huge success. Shy Boy charted strongly in digital charts and Secret won their first trophy on music shows with the song. They won a total of 5 trophies in various music shows with Shy Boy. In March 2011, Hyoseong was chosen as a regular cast on KBS's Oh! My School. Secret continued their success with the release of their second CD single entitled "Starlight Moonlight". The title track became another hit for Secret as the song reached number one on the Gaon Monthly Singles Charts and won them another trophy in SBS's Inkigayo.

The same year, Secret began a foray of Japanese activities with the Japanese release of Madonna and Shy Boy. The Japanese remake of "Madonna" debuted at number nine in the Oricon singles charts. Secret was the third of three Korean girl groups to debut on the Oricon chart in the top 10, the others being Kara and Girls Generation. In October 2011, they released their first studio album entitled Moving in Secret and spawned them another hit with the lead single "Love is Move. Secret released their first mini album in Japan entitled Shy Boy. The mini album also debuted at number nine on the Oricon album charts.

On November 23, 2011, Hyoseong was injured after falling down a flight of stairs while leaving the dorm. The accident, which ruptured the cartilage in her left knee and fractured the top of her right foot, halted her promotional activities with Secret.

In February 2012, she played Soo Yeon in the sitcom Salamander Guru and The Shadows that aired on SBS.

On the October 21, 2012 episode of Inkigayo, the live music show revealed a teaser video hinting that twenty of the most-wanted K-pop stars would transform into four new project groups in the yearly event. Hyoseong will be part of the girl group Dazzling Red with Sistar's Hyolyn, 4minute's Hyuna, After School's Nana and KARA's Nicole. Brave Brothers was set to produce the group's new title song. Slated to air on December 29, the group will perform the tunes only one time on stage and the profits from online streaming and downloading of the songs would be donated to people in need. The song "This Person" was released on December 27, 2012.

On August 6, 2013, it was announced that Hyoseong would make her drama debut as Han Na Young in Orion Cinema Network's drama, The Ghost-Seeing Detective Cheo Yong. She starred in the ten-episode drama with Oh Ji-ho and Oh Ji-eun. Hyoseong started filming in the middle of August, to make it in time for the premiere on February 9, 2014. In relation to this, according to Hyoseong, she received hard acting training from the drama director during the various shoots for the drama. The drama series ended on April 6, 2014.

2014–2017: Solo debut with Top Secret, Fantasia, Colored, and acting career
In 2014, it was confirmed that Hyoseong would be the second member of Secret, after Song Ji-eun, to make a solo debut. On April 16, 2014, Hyoseong's agency, TS Entertainment, released a statement saying:

TS Entertainment's initial statement was then followed by another through an interview with Star News on April 17, 2014, the day after. The TS Entertainment representative released a statement saying, "Hyoseong will release her solo album on May 12 and begin her official activities."

On May 12, 2014, Hyoseong's solo debut album titled Top Secret was released. The single album has three songs, titled: 여자를 몰라 (You Don't Know Women), 밤이 싫어요 (I Hate The Night), and Goodnight Kiss, the latter being the lead single of Hyoseong's solo debut album. The song 여자를 몰라 (You Don't Know Women) also featured 제이켠 (J'Kyun). In a pre-order release by YesAsia, it was revealed that Hyoseong would be releasing two sets of her albums: a normal and a limited edition.
Hyoseong held her solo debut showcase titled Top Secret Showcase, to present her debut album. The showcase was held at the Ramada Hotel Club Vanguard on May 12, 2014.

In 2014, Hyoseong was cast as Han Soo-ri on the KBS1 daily drama My Dear Cat. The drama aired from June 9 to November 21, 2014.

Hyoseong released her first extended play titled Fantasia on May 7, 2015. Into You was promoted as the lead single. Hyoseong also took part in writing lyrics for the album writing the track titled How Can I. On music programs, Taxi Driver was promoted along with the lead single. In the same year, Hyoseong reprises her role as Han Na Young in the second season of Orion Cinema Network's drama, The Ghost-Seeing Detective Cheo Yong.

Hyoseong released her second extended play titled Colored on March 28, 2016. Find Me was promoted as the lead single which featured TS Entertainment labelmate D.Action from the hip-hop duo Untouchable. Hyoseong co-wrote the lead single while also writing lyrics for other songs on the album such as Dear Moon which was promoted on music programs alongside the lead single.

In May 2016, it was announced that Hyoseong was cast as Park Bo-yeon in the thriller drama, Wanted. Hyoseong's work on the drama earned her the Special Acting Award – Actress in a Genre Drama at the 2016 SBS Drama Awards.

In October 2016, it was announced that Hyoseong would be replacing Cao Lu as one of the hosts on the talk show Video Star. The show's producer explained Hyoseong was chosen as one of the new hosts because she "has great passion and perseverance for work, and she is going to have awesome chemistry with other show hosts. Viewers will be impressed with her realness and honesty." Hyoseong has been one of the talk-show hosts since October 18, 2016.

In 2017, Hyoseong was cast as Kim Gyori on the tvN drama Introvert Boss. Hyoseong expressed her difficulty with this role in an interview with BNT International stating, "It was frustrating. I'm not the type to keep things to myself, but Gyori was the opposite. I think a lot and can be shy, but I am extroverted to the extent that I express what I want to say. The director allowed us to ad-lib some parts, and it was hard at times to keep my real outgoing personality from coming out." The drama aired every Monday and Tuesday from January 16 to March 14, 2017.

2018–present: Legal disputes with TS Entertainment and change of entertainment label

On February 28, 2018, it was reported that Hyoseong was in legal disputes with her agency TS Entertainment. Hyoseong's legal disputes with the agency is due to issues with not receiving payments. TS Entertainment responded, “The agency wanted to continue management duties and support her entertainment activities, but she refused and it is her will to continue a lawsuit, so we are working on a response to the situation.”

On March 5, Hyoseong's lawyer revealed that she had filed a civil lawsuit against TS Entertainment in September 2017 to confirm that her contract with the agency is no longer valid. Hyoseong's lawyer stated "First, there are payments that Jun Hyoseong has not received. TS Entertainment also transferred the management rights conferred by its exclusive contract with the singer to another party without the consent of Jun Hyoseong herself. Not only is this a clear violation of her contract, but it is also a source of instability in her promotions as a singer." Her lawyer also stated that it would be unlikely of Hyoseong to remain a member of Secret while under TS Entertainment due to the lack of trust and communication between the agency and Hyoseong.

On October 29, it was announced that Hyoseong would return to the entertainment industry as she signed with Tommy & Partners Entertainment after an ongoing legal battle with TS Entertainment. A representative of Tommy & Partners Entertainment stated "recently, Jun Hyoseong's exclusive contract with her former agency was ruled invalid. While searching for a new agency in order to resume her activities in the entertainment industry, she ended up signing an exclusive contract with Tommy & Partners. After signing an exclusive contract with us, Jun Hyoseong has become part of our family. Jun Hyoseong is talented in many areas, including singing, acting, and variety, and we will not hold back in fully supporting her so that she can make a fresh start."

On November 14, The Seoul Western District Court ruled in Hyoseong's favor in her legal battle against TS Entertainment. The court stated, "We confirm that the exclusive contract between Jun Hyoseong and TS Entertainment holds no validity. The defendant (TS Entertainment) must pay the plaintiff (Jun Hyoseong) approximately 130 million won (approximately $114,840) in remaining down payments and unpaid wages." With the court ruling in Hyoseong's favor she will now resume her work as an entertainer with her new agency Tommy & Partners Entertainment.

In April 2021, Jun signed a contract with the IOK Company.

On September 6, 2022, it was announced that Hyoseong would be releasing "Come to the Story of the Sea" as the travel theme song for the "2022 Welcome to Lively Incheon project."

Personal life

Family background
Hyoseong is the middle child out of three sisters. According to Hyoseong, her two sisters were born at home while she was born at a hospital. Since they were young, her family struggled financially and they worked together making newspaper deliveries. Her father was a construction worker.

Issues and controversies

Secret's car accident
On December 11, 2012, Secret was involved in a car accident. According to a report by Sports Chosun, around 2:00 am in Korean standard time, the van that Secret rode in was filmed speeding down the highway by another vehicle with a camera. It was then seen hitting an ice patch which caused their van to slide and veer off the road hitting the guardrail and flipping over. The van was then caught passing in front of another car, however, the other driver managed to hit the brakes and avoided slamming into the group's van, which would have resulted in the van's crash becoming more serious.

It was initially reported that Hyoseong had received serious injuries and was immediately taken to the hospital. However, a YTN News update revealed that although Hyoseong had injured her knee and had to wear a cast, it was a fellow Secret member, Jung Ha-na, who received the most serious injuries after breaking her ribs. Following the accident, Secret went into hiatus, stopping their "Talk That" song promotions.

In a follow-up television report by web portal Nate, a fellow Secret member Song Ji-eun explained how their leader, Hyoseong saved her life during the accident. She said:

Hyoseong's act was commended by many netizens.

Impersonators

On May 3, 2013, Hyoseong came forward on her Twitter account to make it clear that she did not have a Facebook account after an unknown person impersonated her on the social networking site. Hyoseong had also warned her fans against various impersonation accounts that had frequently shown up.

However, the problem did not stop for TS Entertainment, who had to release a follow-up statement on their Twitter account, cautioning fans that Hyoseong does not use Facebook. The agency said, "We've discovered Facebook account(s) posing as Hyoseong.  Hyoseong does not use Facebook.  We hope that no one falls victim to the imposter account(s)."

Additionally, they said that Hyoseong and her updates can still be followed by her fans through her accounts on Twitter and Instagram.

Leaked school records
On November 11, 2013, Hyoseong's school records were leaked online on an Online community site. Her school records, which date back to 2008 when she was a student majoring in theater and film at Inha University, showed her class section, her complete address, her social security number, her e-mail address and her phone number.

TS Entertainment responded to the issue the next day, November 12, 2013, by announcing that they were aware of the leak regarding Hyoseong's personal information, that they will be talking with the school to find the source of the leak. TS also said that if an issue occurs, they will definitely take legal action. The specific details of that legal action was to be identified and revealed after an investigation.

Misuse of the word 'democratization'
During the May 14, 2013 broadcast of SBS Power FM's Choi Hwajung's Power Time, the four members of Secret participated in a game in which they were given two options and each member would say which one they preferred. The game was done in order to test the members' teamwork and see if they would agree on one thing and have the same set of answers. With the several pairs of choices given, the members of Secret were able to agree three times. After the MC declared this, Hyoseong then made a remark, stating:

The term "Minjuhwa(민주화)", translated as democratization, defined as the transition from an authoritarian regime to a more democratic political regime, has been used by the Ilbe online community as a slang term. Ilbe users use the term as their "down-voting button", using "democratization" to mean 'the citizens create chaos', 'to destroy', or 'to make disappear'.

In response to this, netizens began claiming that Hyoseong has used the term "democratization" in a negative manner.

Artistry and influences
Hyoseong has said that she was influenced by pop and R&B groups such as Fin.K.L and SES She was also influenced by South Korean ballad singers such as Kim Bum-soo, Sung Si-kyung and Kim Yeon-woo. When it came to dancing, Hyoseong said that she was influenced by the American singer Beyoncé particularly. She also stated that Beyoncé is one of her music idols. TS Entertainment uploaded a video of Hyoseong performing a cover of Beyoncé's Naughty Girl and Crazy in Love in Secret's 1st Japan Tour in March 2012. Because of her work with Secret, she portrays a mix of cute and sexy image through their songs such as "Shy Boy" and "Madonna".

Endorsements and other activities
Along with Secret, Hyoseong has been featured as a model for various endorsement deals such as Grand Mer (Online Fishing Game), Nike, Nene Chicken, Good Day Soju and Parkga among others. Along with Han Sunhwa, Kim Himchan and Bang Yong Guk, Hyoseong was chosen as a model for KELLAN sportswear 11/12 Winter Collection in September 2011. In December 2010, Secret and the Korean Non-Life Insurance Association (KNIA) teamed up to film a Commercial Film in a Kangnam studio to share their message of concern against drunk driving. With Secret, they were also appointed as ambassadors in campaigns and events such as The Seoul Competition Movie Content 'Streamed Seoul 2009' Goodwill Ambassador(2009), The 18th National Women's Soccer Tournament ambassador(2010), The Eco-Project environmental campaign 'URBAN FARM'(2010), The 8th International Paralympic Skills Competition(2010) and others. In December 2011, Secret were appointed as PR ambassadors for the ‘Korea Consumers Forum’. Hyoseong was also an active endorser of the lingerie 'Yes' since being chosen as the brand model on January 29, 2013. In 2014, Hyoseong was chosen as the model of smartphone game 'Hero's Star'. In 2016, Hyoseong was chosen as the model of a male cosmetic brand 'Swagger'.

Discography

Extended plays

Single albums

Singles

Collaborations

Soundtracks

Filmography

Television series

Web series

Television shows

Radio shows

Hosting

Ambassadorship

Awards and nominations

References

External links
  Official Japanese website
  Official Korean website

Secret (South Korean band) members
TS Entertainment artists
People from Seoul
Living people
South Korean female idols
K-pop singers
South Korean television actresses
South Korean women pop singers
South Korean television personalities
1989 births